Rehman Town is a new town in the H-15 Sector of Islamabad. The H sectors of Islamabad are mostly dedicated to educational and health institutions. National University of Sciences and Technology covers a major portion of sector H-12. 

It has a private school, hospital, parks and other facilities. It is near the Chowk and Kashmir highway and the Daewoo Pakistan bus stop..

Gallery

References

Villages in Islamabad Capital Territory